Tetrameranthus is a genus of plant in family Annonaceae. It contains 7 species, all occurring in South America.

 Tetrameranthus duckei, R.E.Fr. 1939 - Brazil (Amazonas), Colombia, Venezuela
 Tetrameranthus globuliferus, Westra 1988 - Ecuador
 Tetrameranthus guianensis, Westra & Maas 2012 - Brazil (Amapa), French Guiana
 Tetrameranthus laomae, D.R.Simpson 1975 - Brazil (Acre, Amazonas, Para), Colombia, Peru
 Tetrameranthus macrocarpus, R.E.Fr. 1957 - Colombia
 Tetrameranthus pachycarpus, Westra 1985 - Peru
 Tetrameranthus umbellatus, Westra 1985 - Brazil (Amazonas, Para), Peru

References

Annonaceae
Annonaceae genera
Taxonomy articles created by Polbot